is a Shinto shrine located in Takachiho, Miyazaki prefecture, Japan. It is dedicated to Takachihosumegami (高千穂皇神) and Jisshyadaimyoujin (十社大明神).

Admission fees
The shrine is open to the public. However, an admission fee is payable.
500 yen per person over 20 years old.
400 yen per person under 20 years old.

Shinto shrines in Miyazaki Prefecture
Beppyo shrines